The men's heavyweight (91 kg/200.2 lbs) Full-Contact category at the W.A.K.O. European Championships 2004 in Budva was the second heaviest of the male Full-Contact tournaments and involved just five participants.  Each of the matches was three rounds of two minutes each and were fought under Full-Contact kickboxing rules.

As there were not enough fighters for a tournament designed for eight, three of the participants had a bye through to the semi finals.  The gold medal winner was amateur boxing champion Milorad Gajović from hosts Serbia and Montenegro who defeated Russia's Anatoly Nossyrev in the final by majority decision.  Defeated semi finalists, Balazs Varga from Hungary and Andreas Hampel from Germany had to make do with bronze medals.

Results

Key

See also
List of WAKO Amateur European Championships
List of WAKO Amateur World Championships
List of male kickboxers

References

External links
 WAKO World Association of Kickboxing Organizations Official Site

W.A.K.O. European Championships 2004 (Budva)